Pleins pouvoirs ('Full powers') is a book written in 1939 by French author and diplomat Jean Giraudoux in which he discusses proposed reforms needed in France in the context of the nation's cultural heritage.

References

Readings
 Giraudoux, Jean, Pleins Pouvoirs, French & European Pubns, January 11, 1999, 
Pierre Vidal-Naquet, Les Juifs, la mémoire et le présent. Réflexions sur le génocide.  
 Léon Poliakov : Histoire de l’antisémitisme, Calmann-Lévy, 1977, vol. 4, p. 334. 
 R. Y. Dufour, Actualité du racisme de Jean Giraudoux, 1986, pp. 49-70

External links
 Open Letter to Michel Onfray

1939 non-fiction books
French books
Works by Jean Giraudoux